Jorgelina Aruzzi (born September 30, 1974) is an Argentine actress.

Trajectory  
She has participated in renowned television series as Chiquititas, Son Amores, Amor Mío, La Niñera, La Dueña and others.

TV series   
 2013  Vecinos en Guerra
 2012 La pelu
 2012 La Dueña
 2011 Los únicos
 2011 El hombre de tu vida
 2011 Recordando el show de Alejandro Molina
 2010 Alguien que me quiera
 2008 Aquí no hay quien viva
 2006 Chiquititas 2006
 2005 Amor Mío
 2004 El disfraz
 2004 La Niñera
 2002/03 Son Amores
 2002 Dadyvertido
 2002 Una para todas
 2001 El sodero de mi vida
 2001 Peor es nada
 2001 Campeones
 2000 Chabonas
 1998 Los Rodriguez
 1997/98 El Show de Videomatch
 1995/96 El palacio de la risa

External links
  
 

1974 births
Living people
Argentine actresses